Mamun Hossain is a Bangladeshi cricketer. He made his first-class debut for North Zone in the 2015–16 Bangladesh Cricket League on 7 March 2016. He made his List A debut for Partex Sporting Club in the 2016–17 Dhaka Premier Division Cricket League on 17 April 2017.

References

External links
 

Year of birth missing (living people)
Living people
Bangladeshi cricketers
Bangladesh North Zone cricketers
Partex Sporting Club cricketers
Rajshahi Division cricketers
Place of birth missing (living people)